Mount Dade is a  mountain located on the crest of the Sierra Nevada mountain range in northern California, United States. It is situated in the John Muir Wilderness on the boundary between Sierra National Forest and Inyo National Forest, and along the common border of Fresno County with Inyo County. Nearby neighbors include Mount Abbot, 0.4 mile to the northwest, and Bear Creek Spire 1.2 mile to the southeast. The USGS probably named this peak during a 1907–09 survey, and the first ascent was made August 19, 1911, by Liston and McKeen, of Fresno.

Climate
According to the Köppen climate classification system, Mount Dade is located in an alpine climate zone. Most weather fronts originate in the Pacific Ocean, and travel east toward the Sierra Nevada mountains. As fronts approach, they are forced upward by the peaks, causing them to drop their moisture in the form of rain or snowfall onto the range (orographic lift). Precipitation runoff from the west side of this mountain drains into Lake Italy, and from the east side into headwaters of Rock Creek.

Climbing
Established rock climbing routes on Mount Dade:
 South Slope – class 2
 West Chute  –  – First Ascent 1911
 The Hourglass  – class 2 – 1934
 Northwest Chute  – class 3 – FA 1951
 Northeast Face – class 4 – FA 1956
 East Face  – class 4 – FA 1960
 North Pillar – class 5.10 – FA 1995
 North Face - class 5

See also

 List of the major 4000-meter summits of California

References

External links
 Weather forecast: Mount Dade

Inyo National Forest
Sierra National Forest
Mountains of Inyo County, California
Mountains of Fresno County, California
Mountains of the John Muir Wilderness
North American 4000 m summits
Mountains of Northern California
Sierra Nevada (United States)